This list of museums on Long Island is a list of museums in Nassau County, New York and Suffolk County, New York. (Museums in the boroughs of Queens and Brooklyn, which are also physically located on Long Island, are found in List of museums in New York City). Museums that exist only in cyberspace (i.e., virtual museums) are not included. Also included are non-profit art centers and galleries.

Museums

Defunct museums
 Dinosaur Walk Museum, Riverhead, closed in 2008, branches still exist in Pigeon Forge, Tennessee and Branson, Missouri
 Goudreau Museum of Mathematics in Art and Science, New Hyde Park, closed in 2006
 Greenwood Museum
 Museum of Long Island Natural Sciences, formerly operated by Stony Brook University.

See also
List of museums in New York City
List of museums in New York
List of university art museums and galleries in New York State

References

External links
Discover Long Island: Arts and Culture

Long Island

Museums
Long Island
Museums on Long Island
Museums